Walking meditation, sometimes known as kinhin (Chinese: 經行; Pinyin: jīngxíng; Romaji: kinhin or kyōgyō; Korean: gyeonghyaeng; Vietnamese: kinh hành), is a practice within several forms of Buddhism that involve movement and periods of walking between long periods of sitting meditation. In different forms, the practice is common in various traditions of both Theravada and in Mahayana Buddhism.

Practice

Practitioners typically walk clockwise around a room while holding their hands in a gesture with one hand closed in a fist while the other hand grasps or covers the fist (rōmaji: shashu). During walking meditation each step is taken after each full breath. The pace of walking meditation can be either slow (several steady steps per each breath) or brisk, almost to the point of jogging.

Etymology
The term kinhin consists of the Chinese words 經, meaning "to go through (like the thread in a loom)", with "sutra" as a secondary meaning, and 行, meaning "walk". Taken literally, the phrase means "to walk straight back and forth."

Health benefits

Studies on the elderly, type 2 diabetes patients, and nursing students all demonstrate wide health benefits. Although research is in some cases tentative, results suggest that there are numerous health benefits to walking meditation. One common connection is a reduction/regulation of cortisol in the blood, which is the body's primary stress indicating hormone. While the body and mind are working harder, stress regulating factors decrease. One study of elderly women practicing walking meditation suggests mindful walking is somehow linked to decreases in depression and stress, in addition to increases in bone development. Another study based on Tai chi meditation speculates a link between walking meditation and the production of catecholamines, which are linked to the brain's response to stress. Recent advances in medical science also suggest that promoting peace and mindfulness are linked to neuronal regeneration. The act of walking peacefully and with intention is curative to one who practices it.

Several studies have shown that anxiety can be reduced through physical activities and meditation. This is beneficial for young adults who have anxiety disorder. In 2017, university researchers conducted an experiment on these young adults. The purpose of this experiment is to find what would help young adults cope with anxiety. In this experiment, the young adults were split into 5 groups brisk walking, meditation, walking meditation, meditation then walking and sitting. The researchers discovered one common factor in reducing anxiety, which is meditation. Three out of five groups that did meditation had the same amount of reduction in anxiety. However, the two groups that did not make any changes were brisk walking and sitting. In conclusion, regular meditation, walking meditation, meditation plus walking all have the same effects on anxiety.

See also
 Ānāpānasati
 Anussati
 Buddhist meditation
 Circumambulation
 Jarāmaraṇa
 Samatha
 Shikantaza
 Vipassanā

References

Bibliography
 
 
  doi.org/10.1016/0022-3999(92)90072-A
Prakhinkit, Susaree "Effects of Buddhist Walking Meditation on glycemic control and vascular functions in patients with Type-2 Diabetes." Journal of Alternative and Complementary Medicine doi.org/10.1016/j.ctim.2016.03.009
Prakhinkit, Susaree "Effects of Buddhism walking meditation on depression, functional fitness, and endothelium-dependent vasodilation in depressed elderly." Journal of Alternative and Complementary Medicine, vol. 20, no. 5, 2014, doi.org/10.1089/acm.2013.0205
Chatutain, Apsornsawan “Walking Meditation Promotes Ankle Proprioception and Balance Performance among Elderly Women.” doi.org/10.1016/j.jbmt.2018.09.152
Smith, Alison. “Walking Meditation: Being Present and Being Pilgrim on the Camino De Santiago.” Religions, vol. 9, no. 3, 2018, p. 82., doi:10.3390/rel9030082

Zen
Buddhist meditation
Walking
Zazen